Son of Roaring Dan is a 1940 American Western film directed by Ford Beebe and written by Clarence Upson Young. The film stars Johnny Mack Brown, Fuzzy Knight, Nell O'Day, Jean Brooks, Robert Homans and Tom Chatterton. The film was released on July 26, 1940, by Universal Pictures.

Plot

Cast        
Johnny Mack Brown as Jim Reardon 
Fuzzy Knight as Tick Belden
Nell O'Day as Jane Belden
Jean Brooks as Eris Brooks
Robert Homans as Roaring Dan McPhail
Tom Chatterton as Stuart Manning
John Eldredge as Thorndyke
Ethan Laidlaw as Matt Gregg
Lafe McKee as Frank Brooks
Richard Alexander as Big Taylor 
Eddie Polo as Charlie Gregg
John Beach as Steve
Jack Shannon as Tom

References

External links
 

1940 films
American Western (genre) films
1940 Western (genre) films
Universal Pictures films
Films directed by Ford Beebe
American black-and-white films
1940s English-language films
1940s American films